No New York is a No Wave compilation album released in 1978 by record label Antilles under the curation of producer Brian Eno. Although it only contained songs by four different artists, some consider it to be a definitive single album documenting New York City's late-1970s no wave movement.

Background and production

Early in 1978, New York's Artists Space hosted a five night underground no wave music festival, organized by artists Michael Zwack and Robert Longo, that featured ten local bands; including Rhys Chatham's The Gynecologists, Communists, Glenn Branca's Theoretical Girls, Terminal, Chatham's Tone Death (performing his composition for electric guitars Guitar Trio) and Branca's Daily Life (with Barbara Ess, Paul McMahon and Christine Hahn). The final two days of the show featured DNA and the Contortions on Friday, followed by Mars and Teenage Jesus and the Jerks on Saturday. English musician and producer Brian Eno, who had originally come to New York to produce the second Talking Heads album More Songs About Buildings and Food, was in the audience. Impressed by what he saw and heard, and advised by Diego Cortez to do so, Eno was convinced that this movement should be documented and proposed the idea of a compilation album with himself as a producer.

When Eno recorded No New York, some of the sessions were done without much of the stylized production he was known for on other artists' albums. James Chance stated that the Contortions tracks were "done totally live in the studio, no separation between the instruments, no overdubs, just like a document." In 1979 Eno stated in his now famous lecture, "The Studio as Compositional Tool", that, "On 'Helen Thormdale'  from the No New York album, I put an echo on the guitar part's click, and used that to trigger the compression on the whole track, so it sounds like helicopter blades."

Release 

No New York was released in 1978 by Antilles Records. The original pressing of the LP contained a lyric sheet that was intentionally printed on the inside of the record sleeve, which forced the owner to have to tear apart the sleeve to read the lyrics. The album was first reissued on CD by Island Records in Japan. It was reissued in 2005 by Lilith Records on vinyl and digipak form on CD.

Reception

Critic Richard C. Walls, writing for Creem, described No New York as the most "ferociously avant-garde and aggressively ugly music since Albert Ayler puked all over my brain back in – what? – 64" and stated "If you're intrepid enough to want to hear this stuff (a friend, 3/4 into the first side, complained that the music was painful – she wasn't referring to any abstract reaction, she was grimacing), be advised that Antilles is a division of Island Records, which ain't exactly Transamerica Corp. You'll probably have to make a little effort to procure it, because there's no way it's going to come to you."

Retrospective reviews of the album have been positive. Todd Kristel of the online music database AllMusic stated that "this seminal album remains the definitive document of New York's no wave movement", but also echoed Walls's statement from 1978, saying, "Some listeners may be fascinated by the music on No New York while others may find it unbearable".

In December 2007, Blender placed the album at number 65 on their list of "The 100 Greatest Indie-Rock Albums Ever".

Track listing

Personnel

 Contortions
 James Chance – saxophone, vocals
 Don Christensen – drums
 Jody Harris – guitar
 Pat Place – slide guitar
 George Scott III – bass
 Adele Bertei – Acetone organ

 Teenage Jesus and the Jerks
 Lydia Lunch – guitar, vocals
 Gordon Stevenson – bass
 Bradley Field – drums

 Mars
 Sumner Crane – guitar, vocals
 China Burg – guitar, vocals
 Mark Cunningham – bass, vocals
 Nancy Arlen – drums

 D.N.A.
 Arto Lindsay – guitar, vocals
 Robin Crutchfield – organ, vocals
 Ikue Mori – drums

 Additional personnel
 Brian Eno – producer, cover design, cover photo
 Kurt Munkasci – engineer
 Vishek Woszcyk – engineer
 Roddy Hui – assistant engineer
 Steven Keister – cover design

Release history

References

Works cited

Further reading

External links
 

1978 compilation albums
Albums produced by Brian Eno
No wave
Antilles Records albums
No wave albums